Longtanshan railway station is a railway station of Changchun–Tumen Railway, Jilin–Shulan Railway and Longtanshan–Fengman Railway. The station is located in the Longtan District of Jilin, Jilin province, China.

See also
Changchun–Tumen Railway
Jilin–Shulan Railway
Longtanshan–Fengman Railway

References

Railway stations in Jilin